Lolita Séchan is a French writer. She writes children's books as well as comic books; she published her first graphic novel Les Brumes de Sapa at the age of 36.

Personal life
She is the daughter of French singer, songwriter Renaud. She was married to singer songwriter Renan Luce.

References

Living people
French children's writers
French women children's writers
Year of birth missing (living people)